Azm, AZM or variants may refer to:

People 
 Al-Azm family, prominent Syrian family
 As'ad Pasha al-Azm (c. 1706 – 1758), governor of Damascus
 Sulayman Pasha al-Azm (died 1743), governor of Damascus
 Ibrahim Pasha al-Azm (died 1746), governor of Tripoli and Sidon
 Haqqi al-Azm (1864–1955), former prime minister of Syria
 Khalid al-Azm (1903–1965), five times prime minister of Syria
 Sadiq Jalal al-Azm (1934–2016), Syrian philosophy professor
 AZM (wrestler) (born 2002), Japanese professional wrestler

Places
 Azm Palace, Damascus, Syria
 Azm Palace (Hama), Syria

Other uses 
 Project Azm, a cancelled Pakistani aircraft project
 Old Azerbaijani manat, a former currency of Azerbaijan
 Ipalapa Amuzgo, ISO 639 language code azm, a dialect of Amuzgo
 Azinphos-methyl, an organophosphate insecticide
 American Zionist Movement, the American federation of Zionist groups

See also

 Azem (disambiguation)
 Azim (disambiguation)